The 1977–78 Norwegian 1. Divisjon season was the 39th season of ice hockey in Norway. Ten teams participated in the league, and Manglerud Star won the championship.

First round

Second round

Final round

Relegation round

External links 
 Norwegian Ice Hockey Federation

Nor
GET-ligaen seasons
1977 in Norwegian sport
1978 in Norwegian sport